A robe of honour (plural , or , pl.  or ) was a term designating rich garments given by medieval and early modern Islamic rulers to subjects as tokens of honour, often as part of a ceremony of appointment to a public post, or as a token of confirmation or acceptance of vassalage of a subordinate ruler. They were usually produced in government factories and decorated with the inscribed bands known as ṭirāz.

History 
The endowment of garments as a mark of favor is an ancient Middle Eastern tradition, recorded in sources such as the Old Testament and Herodotus.

In the Islamic world, Muhammad himself set a precedent when he removed his cloak and gave it to Ka'b bin Zuhayr in recognition of a poem praising him. Indeed, the term  "denotes the action of removing one's garment in order to give it to someone".

The practice of awarding robes of honour appears in the Abbasid Caliphate, where it became such a regular feature of government that ceremonies of bestowal occurred almost every day, and the members of the caliph's court became known as 'those who wear the '. The bestowal of garments became a fixed part of any investment into office, from that of a governor to the heir-apparent to the throne. As important court occasions, these events were often commemorated by poets and recorded by historians. 

In Fatimid Egypt, the practice spread to the wealthy upper middle classes, who began conferring robes of honor on friends and relatives, in emulation of the aristocracy. Under the Mamluk Sultanate of Egypt, the system was standardized into a system of classes reflecting the divisions of Mameluke society, each with its own ranks: the military, the civilian bureaucracy, and the religious scholars. The distribution of the robes of honour was the responsibility of the Keeper of the Privy Purse, who supervised the Great Treasury, where the garments were stored.

As the practice spread in the Islamic world, and robes began to be given for every conceivable occasion, they also acquired distinct names.

Sums of money or other valuables were also given as part of the bestowal ceremony, or, in some cases, in lieu of the robe.

See also
 Tiraz
 Chelengk
 Khalat

References

Sources
 
 

Islamic art
Clothing
Award items
Government of the Abbasid Caliphate
Ottoman clothing
Government of the Mamluk Sultanate